Barbodes hemictenus is a species of cyprinid fish endemic to the island of Mindoro in the Philippines.  It is only known to occur in the Sabaan, Mamboc and Baco rivers and Lake Naujan.  This species can reach a length of  TL.

References

Barbodes
Fish described in 1908
Taxonomy articles created by Polbot
Fish of the Philippines
Taxa named by David Starr Jordan
Taxa named by Robert Earl Richardson